Igor Trushkin (born 17 January 1994) is a Russian futsal player, who plays for Dina Moscow as a goalkeeper.

Biography
Trushkin is a graduate of Dina. He is a student of the Institute of State and Municipal Management. He made his debut with Dina in the 2012/2013 season. In the following year, he became Russian Futsal Super League champion. He played 41 games and conceded 97 goals for Dina.

Honours
 Russian Futsal Youth League bronze medalist
 Russian Futsal Youth League "Ural-Western Siberia" zone winner  
 Russian Central Region Doublers League winner (2012/13) 
 Russian Futsal Super League winner (2013/14)

External links
MFK Dina Moskva profile
AMFR profile

1994 births
Living people
Futsal goalkeepers
MFK Dina Moskva players
Russian men's futsal players